Erik Nys (born 27 July 1973) is a retired Belgian long jumper.

His personal best jump is 8.25 metres, achieved in July 1996 in Hechtel. This is the current Belgian record.

Achievements

References

External links

1973 births
Living people
Belgian male long jumpers
Athletes (track and field) at the 1996 Summer Olympics
Athletes (track and field) at the 2000 Summer Olympics
Olympic athletes of Belgium
Universiade medalists in athletics (track and field)
Universiade bronze medalists for Belgium